An anamonic is a form of mnemonic device frequently employed by tournament Scrabble players (the word anamonic is itself a portmanteau of anagram and mnemonic). It consists of a six or seven letter "stem" (often, but not always, an acceptable word itself), paired with a phrase in which each letter can be added to the stem and rearranged (anagrammed) to form a new word. Typical stems are sets of six or seven letters, as such anamonics aid in learning and in finding valuable seven- and eight-letter bingo (UK: "bonus") plays. Just as importantly, a player can quickly verify that he or she should not waste valuable time looking for a word in a set of letters that is ruled out by an anamonic.

A successful anamonic will typically have some memorable semantic relationship to the stem.  It will usually avoid unnecessary or easily confused words, which might lead to a misconception of just which letters combine with the stem.

When no vowel combines with the stem, an anamonic phrase will typically make use of multiple vowels that are meant to be ignored.  A skilled Scrabble player will typically be able to verify that at least one of these vowels does not form an acceptable word with the stem, thereby avoiding confusion.

Authorship of particularly noteworthy anamonics is often acknowledged, although this is not necessarily expected by the Scrabble community.

Example anamonic (North American word list)

TSUNAMI: COASTAL HARM

TSUNAMI+C = TSUNAMIC
TSUNAMI+O = MANITOUS TINAMOUS
TSUNAMI+A = AMIANTUS
TSUNAMI+S = TSUNAMIS
TSUNAMI+T = ANTISMUT
TSUNAMI+L = SIMULANT
TSUNAMI+H = HUMANIST
TSUNAMI+R = NATRIUMS NATURISM
TSUNAMI+M = MANUMITS

Etymology

The term "anamonics" was coined in a private letter to Nick Ballard in 1993. The coiner was Bob Lipton, who was probably the first or second player in history to make extensive use of anamonics before they even had a name. Lipton's first anamonics were constructed in the summer of 1987. It was Ballard who first popularized the technique in a series of articles published in the now-defunct newsletter "Medleys."

External links
Canonical List of Anamonics (maintained by John Chew)

Scrabble
Mnemonics
Word games
Word play